Margaret "Grete" Moscheles (née Margarethe Sobernheim) (1854–1924) was a British painter.

Biography 
She was born as Margarethe Sobernheim in 1854 in Berlin, Germany. She was from a Jewish family. In 1875, she married painter Felix Moscheles in Germany, with whom she studied painting with.  Margaret and her husband spent the winter of 1893 in traveling in North Africa, which inspired a body of artwork.

She showed her work at the Royal Academy of Arts in London in 1905 and 1912. In 1908, she had a group exhibition at the London Salon of the Allied Artists' Association in Royal Albert Hall.

Her work is included in various public museums including National Trust, Smallhythe Place; among others.

References 

1854 births
1924 deaths
British women painters
People from London
19th-century British women artists
Jewish painters